Blastobasis ochromorpha is a moth in the family Blastobasidae. It is found in India and Singapore.

The wingspan is about 13 mm. Adults are pale coloured.

The larvae feed on a wide range of plants, including onion and stored rice. They have also been recorded feeding within the seeds of Shorea robusta.

References

Moths described in 1925
Blastobasis
Moths of Asia
Moths of Singapore